The Baldwyn School District is a public school district based in Baldwyn, Mississippi (USA).

The district covers southwestern Prentiss and northern Lee counties.

Schools
Baldwyn High School (Grades 9-12)
Baldwyn Middle School (Grades 5-8)
Baldwyn Elementary School (Grades K-4)

Demographics

2006-07 school year
There were a total of 942 students enrolled in the Baldwyn School District during the 2006–2007 school year. The gender makeup of the district was 46% female and 54% male. The racial makeup of the district was 51.91% White, 47.24% Black, 0.74% Hispanic, and 0.11% Asian. 57.0% of the district's students were eligible to receive free lunch.

Previous school years

Accountability statistics

Notable alumni
 Laura Pendergest-Holt - Chief investment officer of the Stanford Financial Group

References

External links
 

Education in Prentiss County, Mississippi
Education in Lee County, Mississippi
School districts in Mississippi